Amata of Assisi was a Poor Clare nun. After a youth misspent, Amata became very ill and was healed by her aunt, St. Clare. With this miracle she changed her life and entered the Poor Clares, later becoming an acquaintance of St. Dominic.

References

Italian Roman Catholic saints
13th-century Christian saints
1250 deaths
Poor Clares
Year of birth unknown